10 Play could refer to:

 10 Play (Network 10), the video on demand and catch up TV service for Australia's Network 10
 Gamer.tv, a weekly British television show produced by the company of the same name